Irina Valentinovna Pozdnyakova (born 29 April 1953) is a retired Russian swimmer. In 1966, aged 13, she set a world record in the 200 m breaststroke. The same year she won a silver medal at the 1966 European Aquatics Championships.

She is married to the Olympic volleyball player Vyacheslav Zaytsev; they have a daughter, Anna (born 1975), and a son, Ivan, an Olympic volleyball player. Both children hold Italian citizenship: Ivan was born on 2 October 1988 in Italy, where his father played for several years, whereas Anna married an Italian in 1993.

References

1953 births
Living people
Russian female swimmers
Female breaststroke swimmers
Soviet female swimmers
European Aquatics Championships medalists in swimming